Robert Cumming (born 7 December 1955) is a Scottish former footballer. A combative defender or midfielder who spent the majority of his career at Grimsby Town, where he is remembered for the ferocity of his tackling, before joining Lincoln City in 1987. He was an integral part of Lincoln's Conference winning team and was rewarded by being voted the player of the season. He went on to enjoy another two seasons with the Imps in the Football League, and was voted 23rd in the top 100 Lincoln City league legends.

He emigrated to the United States in 1990, settling in Kendallville, Indiana and working as a finishing supervisor at MTA in Auburn, Indiana.

References

External links
 Interview with Bobby Cumming
 

Living people
1955 births
People from Kendallville, Indiana
British emigrants to the United States
Scottish footballers
Association football defenders
Association football midfielders
Scottish Football League players
English Football League players
American Soccer League (1988–89) players
American Professional Soccer League players
Albion Rovers F.C. players
Grimsby Town F.C. players
Lincoln City F.C. players
Grimsby Borough F.C. players
Albany Capitals players
Baillieston Juniors F.C. players
Scottish Junior Football Association players
Scottish expatriate footballers
Scottish expatriate sportspeople in the United States
Expatriate soccer players in the United States